Blackford Hill  is a hill in Edinburgh, the capital city of Scotland. It is in the area of Blackford, between Morningside, and the Braid Hills. Together with the Hermitage of Braid, it comprises the  Hermitage of Braid and Blackford Hill Local Nature Reserve, within which lies Hermitage House.

History
There is an ancient hill fort on the summit area of the hill which, along with the circular foundations of some nearby houses, is protected as a Scheduled Ancient Monument.

Blackford Hill was bought by the Edinburgh Corporation in 1884, and the adjacent Hermitage of Braid estate was given to the city of Edinburgh in 1938, by its final owner, John McDougal. The gift allowed the Hermitage to be used as "a Public Park or Recreation Ground for the benefit of the citizens." The City of Edinburgh Council retains ownership of the park and is primarily responsible for its maintenance. This is done primarily through the ranger service, with the assistance of other council teams such as Task Force and Forestry Unit.

Geography
The hill has clear views over Edinburgh to the north, and the Pentland Hills to the south. It is popular with walkers, as it has many well established paths, as well as runners and other leisure users. There is a wide range of flora and fauna within a green belt area of Edinburgh, making it an important target for conservation. Around half of the area is unimproved grassland.

The Royal Observatory, Edinburgh is located near the summit. The hilltop also features a police radio transmitter and a meteorological station. Craigmillar Park golf course is situated to the east of Blackford Hill, near the observatory, and the Midmar  allotments and Blackford Pond are adjacent to the hill on the north side.

Midmar Paddock is adjacent to the hill. Owned by the A. J. Laing Trust, proposals to develop it have attracted controversy.

Forestry

Geology
Blackford Hill is formed from Lower Devonian volcanic rocks, lying between Upper Devonian sandstone, the northernmost extent of those found in the Pentland Hills to the South. Geologically the hill is different from the Carboniferous volcanic plugs and intrusions which form the remainder of Edinburgh's hills, with the exception of the nearby Braid Hills.

Of geological and historical interest is Agassiz Rock, a quarry-like feature, situated close to the hill, which was the first evidence of the action of glaciers to be found in Scotland, recognised by the Swiss geologist Louis Agassiz. It is a Site of Special Scientific Interest.

Braid Burn

The Braid Burn is the principal watercourse, flowing for some  through the nature reserve. At this location it is approximately half way along its  course from a spring in the Pentland Hills, to its mouth at Portobello.

Blackford Pond

Blackford Pond lies to the north of the hill, and is popular with families.

External links
 The Royal Observatory, Edinburgh
 Friends of the Hermitage and Braid

References 

Hills of Edinburgh
Parks and commons in Edinburgh
Scheduled monuments in Scotland
Archaeological sites in Edinburgh